Albert Lorch "Al" Loeb (March 11, 1890 – October 13, 1987) was a standout college football player for the Georgia Tech Yellow Jackets football team, where he was nicknamed "The Yiddish Wildcat".

Georgia Tech
Loeb was a prominent center for John Heisman's Georgia Tech Yellow Jackets football teams. Teammates of Loeb's at Tech would include H. W. Patterson and later Hall of Fame coach William Alexander. Loeb is a member of the Georgia Tech Athletics Hall of Fame, inducted in 1959.

1912
One source claims Loeb "is best remembered for the 1912 Tech-Alabama game." The Tide were favored and outweighed the Tech team. Prominent Alabama players included Hargrove and Adrian Van de Graaff. Loeb gave a rousing pep talk before the game. Heisman said "I think Loeb's speech did it. I've never seen madder playing than Al Loeb did that day and inspired by him, we won." Loeb broke three fingers during the game, but had the doctor tape them up and returned to the fray to lead Tech to a 20-3 victory.  Loeb recalled "They were supposed to write their own score. We licked 'em 20-3. 'Tis said I didn't miss a tackle all day. And there were plenty of 'em made... Also, coach John Heisman had a heavy shift that left me on the end so I was eligible as a pass receiver. I caught a couple, too...I was also called upon to do a bit of blocking. We ran series plays, three or four consecutively. We had no huddle -- just lined up, and without a signal we were gone. It seemed just a bit speedier than at present."

1913
Loeb was selected All-Southern in 1913. He was also alternate-captain.

References

1890 births
1987 deaths
Players of American football from Atlanta
American football centers
Georgia Tech Yellow Jackets football players
All-Southern college football players
Jewish American sportspeople
20th-century American Jews